George Khaniri is a Kenyan politician. He belongs to the Amani National Congress (ANC) and was first elected to represent the Hamisi Constituency in the National Assembly of Kenya in the 1996 by election after his father's ( the late hamisi MP Hon. Khaniri Snr) demise. He retained the seat in the following elections in 1997, 2002, and 2007. He then won in 2013 as Vihiga county senator after the creation of the two tire government following the 2010 new constitution.

References

Living people
Members of the Senate of Kenya
Orange Democratic Movement politicians
Members of the National Assembly (Kenya)
1973 births